NAnt is a free and open source software tool for automating software build processes.

Nant may also refer to:

Places
 Nant, Aveyron, France, a commune
 Nant (Bex, Switzerland), an alpine pasture

People
 Llef o'r Nant (circa 1782-1863), Welsh Anglican priest
 Nant Bwa Bwa Phan (21st century), Burmese politician
 Twm o'r Nant (1739-1810), Welsh-language dramatist